Torie is a given name and a nickname. Notable people with this name include the following

Given name
Torie Osborn (born 1950), Danish activist, and author

Nickname
Victoria Clarke (born 1959), American communications consultant known as Torie

See also

Terie Norelli
Tore (disambiguation)
Tori (disambiguation)
Toriel
Tories (British political party)
Tories (Scotland)
Torii (surname)
Toril (disambiguation)
Torin (given name)
Torje Olsen Solberg
Torke (disambiguation)
Torpe (disambiguation)
Torre (name)
Towie (disambiguation)
Tyrie (disambiguation)

Nicknames